Elke (see panel for pronunciation) is a feminine given name. Different sources give different accounts of its origin. One source describes it as a Low German and East Frisian diminutive of Adelheid, meaning "of noble birth". Another states that it originated as a Yiddish feminine variant of Elkan, which itself came from the Biblical name Elkanah.

In English-speaking countries, the variant Elkie was popularised by the singer Elkie Brooks. Other German variants of the name include Elka and Alke.

In the United States, the 1990 census found that Elke was the 2,588th most common given name for women, being held by about 0.002% of the female population at the time, while the other variants Elkie, Elka, and Alke were not among the names held by at least 0.001% of the female population (the most common 4,275 names).

People

Elke

 Elke Aberle (born 1950), German actress
 Elke Altmann (born 1957), German politician
 Elke Clijsters (born 1985), Belgian table tennis player
 Elke Drüll (born 1956), German field hockey player
 Elke Felten (born 1943), German sprint canoeist
 Elke Gebhardt (born 1983), German racing cyclist
 Elke Van Gorp (born 1995), Belgian football player
 Elke Heidenreich (born 1943), German journalist
 Elke Hipler (born 1978), German rower
 Elke Hoff (born 1957), German politician
 Elke-Karin Morciniec (born 1943), Polish equestrian
 Elke Karsten (born 1995), Argentine handball player
 Elke König (born 1954), German financial regulator
 Elke Krystufek (born 1970), Austrian artist
 Elke Maravilha (1945–2016), German-born Brazilian actress
 Elke Neidhardt (1941–2013), German-born Australian actress
 Elke Philipp (born 1964), German Paralympic equestrian
 Elke Radlingsmaier (born 1943), German fencer
 Elke Rehder (born 1953), German artist
 Elke Roex (born 1974), Belgian politician
 Elke Schall (born 1973), German table tennis player
 Elke Schmitter (born 1961), German journalist and author
 Elke Sehmisch (born 1955), German swimmer
 Elke Sleurs (born 1968), Belgian politician
 Elke Sommer (born 1940), German actress
 Elke Reva Sudin (born 1987), American artist
 Elke Talma (born 1977), Seychellois swimmer
 Elke Tindemans (born 1961), Belgian politician
 Elke Twesten (born 1963), German politician
 Elke Vanhoof (born 1991), Belgian BMX rider
 Elke Voelker (born 1968), German organist
 Elke U. Weber, American business professor
 Elke Winkens (born 1970), German and Austrian actress
 Elke Wölfling (born 1971), Austrian hurdler

Elka

 Elka Graham (born 1981), Australian swimmer
 Elka de Levie (1905–1979), Dutch gymnast
 Elka Nikolova, Bulgarian-born American film director
 Elka Todorova (born 1956), Bulgarian sociologist and psychologist
 Elka Wardega, Australian makeup artist

Elkie

 Elkie Brooks (born Elaine Bookbinder, 1945), English singer
 Elkie Chong (born Chong Ting-yan, 1998), Hong Kong singer

Fictional characters
 Elke Haien, the wife of the main character in the 1888 German novel The Rider on the White Horse by Theodor Storm
 Elka Ostrovsky, from the 2010–2015 American television show Hot in Cleveland
 Fräulein Elke, a travesti performer from the 1972 film Cabaret

References

External links
 Elke at Beliebte Vornamen
 IGI Individual Record: Catheren Elke at the FamilySearch.org website of the Church of Jesus Christ of Latter Day Saints

Feminine given names
German feminine given names
Dutch feminine given names